Sean Walker (born 24 March 1958) is a British former racing driver. He stopped racing in 2013. His father Ian Walker (1926–2008) was noted as the "Doyen of British Motorsport" (Ref The Independent 18 July 2008) was a driver, engineer and designer/modifier of race cars particularly Lotus. Ian Walker's cars were driven by famous drivers such as Jim Clark, Graham Hill and Peter Arundell.

Racing career
Sean Walker's racing career.

2010

HSCC Derek Bell Trophy
Position: no position
? races. 0 wins. 0 pole positions. 0 podiums. 0 fastest laps. 
Car: March 782
Complete results needed.
 	 	 
2009

HSCC Lloyds TSB Derek Bell Trophy
Position: 11 (20 points)
2 races. 2 wins. 1 pole position. 2 podiums. 2 fastest laps. 
Car: March 782
 	 	 
1992

RAC Esso British Touring Car Championship
Position: 19 (4 points)
13 races. 0 wins. 0 pole positions. 0 podiums. 0 fastest laps. 
Team: Techspeed Racing
Car: BMW M3
 	 	 
1990

RAC Esso British Touring Car Championship
Position: 7 (96 points)
? races. 0 wins. ? pole positions. ? podiums. ? fastest laps.
Car: Ford Sierra RS500
Complete results needed.
 	 	 
1989

RAC Esso British Touring Car Championship
Position: 21 (17 points)
13 races. 0 wins. 0 pole positions. 0 podiums. 0 fastest laps. 
Team: FAI Auto Parts
Car: Ford Sierra RS500 Cosworth
 	
British Touring Car Championship - class A
Position: no position
? races. ? wins. ? pole positions. ? podiums. ? fastest laps.
Complete results needed.
 	 	 
1988

World Sports-Prototype Championship
Position: no position
2 races. 0 wins. 0 pole positions. 0 podiums. 0 fastest laps. 
Team: Sean Walker
Car: Tiga GC287 (Ford)
 	
Formula 3 Britain National Class
Position: 17 (4 points)
1 race. 0 wins. 0 pole positions. 1 podium. 0 fastest laps. 
Team: Techspeed Racing
Car: Reynard 873 (Volkswagen)
 	 	 
1987

World Sports-Prototype Championship
Position: no position
1 race. 0 wins. 0 pole positions. 0 podiums. 0 fastest laps. 
Team: URD Junior
Car: URD C81 (BMW)
 	 	 
1986

Formula 3 Britain National Class
Position: 2 (76 points)
17 races. 4 wins. 2 pole positions. 11 podiums. 1 fastest lap. 
Team: Techspeed Racing
Car: Ralt RT30 (Volkswagen)
 	 	 
1985

Formula 3 Britain National Class
Position: 10 (15 points)
2 races. 1 win. 1 pole position. 2 podiums. 2 fastest laps. 
Team: Richard Dutton Racing
Car: Ralt RT3 (Volkswagen)

Racing record

Complete British Touring Car Championship results
(key) (Races in bold indicate pole position – 1988–1990 in class) (Races in italics indicate fastest lap – 1 point awarded ?–1989 in class)

Personal life
Sean is married to Karen, an ex model and fashion buyer, formerly for the Arcadia Group. She is an acclaimed, award-winning. visual art photographer.
He suffered a serious stroke in 2014 and only survived without excessive brain damage because of his wife, Karen's early intervention.

They have 3 children, 2 grandchildren and  3 dogs.

References

http://www.driverdb.com/drivers/sean-walker/career/
http://www.independent.co.uk/news/obituaries/ian-walker-doyen-of-british-motorsport-870818.html

External links
 BTCC Pages Profile.
 

1958 births
Living people
British Touring Car Championship drivers
Place of birth missing (living people)